Beirut Arab University (BAU) is a Lebanese private university located in Beirut, Lebanon. It was founded by the Lebanese Waqf El-Bir wal Ihsan Society in 1960. The University attained the International Institutional Accreditation from the Foundation for International Business Administration Accreditation (FIBAA) - an official international German foundation - registered in the European Quality Assurance Register (EQAR). The University is ranked 801–1000 in the QS World University Rankings and 40 in Arab Region Rankings for 2022.

Beirut Arab University is a member of:
Association of Arab Universities (AARU)
International Association of Universities (IAU)
Federation of the Universities of the Islamic World (FUIW)
Agence Universitaire de la Francophonie (AUF):
Conférence des Recteurs de la Région du Moyen-Orient(CONFREMO)
Réseau International Francophone des établissements de formation de formateurs (RIFEFF)
Ecole Doctorale de Droit du Moyen- Orient (EDDMO)
Collège Doctoral de Français au Moyen Orient (CODFRAMO)
International Association of University Presidents (IAUP)
Association of Universities of Lebanon
Euro- Mediterranean University (EMUNI)
Euromed Permanent University Forum  (EPUF)
International Council for Open and Distance Education(ICDE)
International Federation of Library Associations and Institutions(IFLA)
Arab Association of Collegiate Registrars& Admissions Officers  ( ARAB-ACRAO)
Association of the Arab Faculties of Dentistry (Affiliated to AARU)
Scientific Association of Colleges of Pharmacy in the Arab World (Affiliated to AARU)
Arab Society of Faculties of Business Administration (Affiliated to AARU)
Union of International Associations (UIA)
Scientific Society of Arab Nursing Faculties (Affiliated to AARU)
Islamic Universities League
United Nations Global Compact
Association for Dental Education in Europe (ADEE)
Arab Forum for Environment and Development (AFED)
Lebanese Academic Library Consortium (LALC)
European Foundation for Management and Development (EFMD)

Faculties

The University currently consists of the following 10 faculties:

Faculty of Human Sciences
Faculty of Law & Political Science
Faculty of Business Administration
Faculty of Architecture – Design and Built Environment
Faculty of Engineering
Faculty of Science
Faculty of Pharmacy
Faculty of Medicine
Faculty of Dentistry
Faculty of Health Sciences

Campuses
Beirut Campus: Beirut Campus was established in 1960. It is the main branch and located in the heart of Beirut in Tarik El Jadida. The land spans an area of 41,107 m2 and comprises two buildings with a total built area 50,500 m2. The main building has an area of 22,000 m2 and is utilized by BAU Administration and the Faculties of Business Administration and Dentistry.

There are a 300-seat festivities hall, five seminar rooms which are furnished and equipped with multimedia and display screens, a specially designed “Al Multaqa”, which is the Center for cultural and art activities, a Student Activities and Alumni & Career Office Building, a gymnasium, sports hall, and a cafeteria.

The second building is the 12-storie Hariri Building, with two basements and a ground floor. It is built on an area of 28,000 m2 and houses five faculties: Human Sciences, Law and Political Science, Pharmacy, Medicine, and Health Sciences.

Debbieh Campus:Debbieh Campus was established in 2006 and is located 33 km from Beirut city. The land spans over an area of 1,353,000 m2, and the total built area is 52,538 m2.

It comprises four buildings for the faculties and the administration, two buildings for student dorms, two buildings for staff dorms, a gymnasium, a mosque, an astronomical observatory, a cafeteria, an open theater, and a student lounge.

The Campus currently holds three Faculties: Architecture – Design & Built Environment, Engineering, and Science.

Tripoli Campus:A campus in Tripoli, Mina Region, North Lebanon, was established in 2010.

Tripoli Branch comprises five faculties so far; the Faculty of Business Administration, the Faculty of Architecture – Design and Built Environment, the Faculty of Engineering, the Faculty of Science, and the Faculty of Health Sciences.

The Branch also provides a multitude of facilities that offer various services to students, staff, researchers, and visitors.

Bekaa Campus:

Bekaa Campus was established in 2011 and is located in Jdeita and Taalbayah real estate area. The land spans an area of 183,391 m2, and the total built area is 1,650 m2.

It has allocated two distinctive locations for the Research Center for Environment and Development and the Alumni Club.

BAU Student Prospectus
Governing bodies: University Higher Council; University Council
Academic year: September to June
Admission requirements: To be accepted for an undergraduate degree, applicants must:
Hold the official Lebanese Secondary School Certificate in a branch relevant to the chosen undergraduate field of specialization, or an official equivalent;
Pass the relevant admission examinations
Tuition Fees The cost of each credit hour is determined by the university administration and fees vary depending on the faculty.
Main language of instruction: Arabic, English, French

English Language Requirements 
All programs and examinations at BAU are set in English except for the Faculties of Arts and Law where the language of instruction varies depending on the nature of the course/s. Hence, applicants must provide evidence of their English language proficiency in one of the following ways:

All undergraduate applicants and transferring students are expected to pass BAU's English Language admission exam with a minimum score of 60%. However, applicants who have passed a TOEFL Exam with a minimum score of 500 or IELTS with a minimum score of 6.5 or have successfully completed the General Certificate of Education (GCE) program are exempted from this English Language admission exam. Similarly, transferring students who have completed a minimum of two years at an institution where the language of instruction is English are exempted from BAU's English Language admission exam.

Financial Aid and Scholarships 
BAU provides direct financial support to students experiencing hardship in the form of tuition fees deductions.
 
Undergraduate Program Scholarships 
BAU offers 4 scholarships annually. These scholarships are available to first year students who rank in the top ten positions in the four branches of the Lebanese Secondary School Certificate. These students can also benefit from these scholarships during their undergraduate study as long as they get a CGPA of 3.33 or above.
Three scholarships are offered to the first three BAU students in each of the departments of the Faculty they are registered in provided that they get a SGPA of 3.00 and above at the end of each semester, with not less than 15 credits per semester. Each semester, a maximum of 5 top students, at each level of all undergraduate programs, who have completed 15 credits and above and have not failed any course during the same semester, are exempted from a percentage of the subsequent semester tuition fees as follows:
1st place:
80%
2nd place:	50%
3rd place:	30%
4th place:	25%
5th place	15%

Prizes 
President's Honor List and Dean's Honor list:
Students with a SGPA of 3.8 or above are included on the President's Honor list and those with a SGPA of 3.5 or above are included on the Dean's Honor list.

Gamal Abdel Nasser Award
A student in the undergraduate level is granted Gamal Abdel Nasser Award for Academic Distinction provided that his grade is not less than "Very Good"

Housing 

Beirut and Tripoli Campuses:

Students living away from their homes and studying in Beirut or Tripoli Campuses can rent a girls-only or boys-only shared or private apartment from various local renters in these regions. Rent is usually paid yearly (two installments) and varies according to location, size, and students sharing the apartment. 

Debbieh Campus: This Campus houses two separate dorms: the girls’ dorms and the boys’ dorms. These are two buildings located inside the campus in close proximity to the parking lot. The dorms encompass a reception area, mini-market which includes basic needs of students, a private gym study rooms, TV hall for students enrolled in the dorms.

The dormitory has 112 rooms available for boys in the boys’ dorms and 66 rooms available for the girls. The dorm rooms range from single to double rooms each having its private bathroom. The rooms are fully furnished with built-in closets, beds, study desks, mini fridge and TV.

The rental fees of the rooms vary between USD 2,000 and 3,800 annually.

Notable alumni 
Prime Minister Rafik Al-Hariri of Lebanon
Prime Minister Abdullah bin Nasser bin Khalifa Al Thani of Qatar
Deputy Prime Minister Tawfiq Kreishan of Jordan
Minister of Interior Eid Al-Fayez of Jordan
Ministry for Foreign Affairs Mohammed Hussein Al Shaali of United Arab Emirates
Former Governor of Jerusalem Jamil Othman Nasser of Palestine
Palestinian Jurist Hilmi M. Zawati
 Shalimar Sharbatly, abstract artist
 Israa Seblani, Lebanese doctor and survivor of the 2020 Beirut explosion
 Former Minister of State Ahmad Karami of Lebanon

BAU Journals 

BAU journals are official publications of Beirut Arab University, currently publishing six scholarly journals that cover a wide range of disciplines, from the humanities and the social sciences to the life and physical sciences. In addition to working with departments and faculties of the University, BAU journals serves a world-wide community of scholars, researchers, and practitioners through the publication of peer-reviewed academic and professional journals in print and electronic form.

The old version of BAU Journal was Al Zamil which used to be an academic, cultural and social periodical magazine published by the University.

References

External links
Beirut Arab University——
BAU alumni
Web Ranking of Beirut Arab University

 
Education in Beirut
Schools in Beirut
Universities in Lebanon
Educational institutions established in 1960
1960 establishments in Lebanon